San Jacinto is a ghost town in along Salmon Falls Creek in northern Elko County, Nevada, United States. It is part of the Elko Micropolitan Statistical Area.

It was the site of a railroad station located eight miles northeast of Contact, Nevada on the Union Pacific railroad.

It is named after the San Jacinto Ranch, which in turn is named for the Battle of San Jacinto, fought at present-day Houston, Texas in 1836.

The San Jacinto post office was in operation from November 1898 through April 1938.

The lowest temperature ever recorded in Nevada,  was recorded in San Jacinto on January 8, 1937.

The site of the former community is just east of U.S. Route 93.or the Great Basin Highway. Most of what remains of the ghost town is what is now the San Jacinto Ranch.

Climate

References

External links

Ghost towns in Nevada
Ghost towns in Elko County, Nevada